Winner is a city in central Tripp County, South Dakota, United States. The population was 2,921 at the 2020 census. It is the county seat of Tripp County. Winner also serves as the administrative center of neighboring Todd County, which does not have its own county seat. The nearest airport is Winner Regional Airport.

Winner was laid out in 1909, and named for the fact the town had emerged the "winner" as the county's most successful trading point.

Description
Jim Palmer, Hall of Fame pitcher for the Baltimore Orioles, played for a college league team in Winner in the summer of 
1963. He said "There are 2,500 people in Winner...There are four girls in town, two restaurants, one movie, no TV, no air-conditioning, and the temperature is always about a hundred."

Winner is also jokingly referred to the location of Nerdfighteria, the community for nerds, as created by the followers of John and Hank Green. Winner is halfway between where John and Hank live today.

Geography

Climate
Winner, located in the south central part of the state, features a climate type (Köppen Dfa) often described as a hot summer humid continental climate. Winters average below the  persistent snow line isotherm, and summers average above the  Köppen hot summer isotherm. The climate features nearly even four seasons, typical of its classification.

Demographics

2010 census
As of the census of 2010, there were 2,897 people, 1,328 households, and 717 families living in the city. The racial makeup of the city was 82.1% White, 0.2% African American, 14.0% Native American, 0.3% Asian, 0.3% from other races, and 3.2% from two or more races. Hispanic or Latino of any race were 1.4% of the population.

There were 1,328 households, of which 24.2% had children under the age of 18 living with them, 39.5% were married couples living together, 10.9% had a female householder with no husband present, 3.5% had a male householder with no wife present, and 46.0% were non-families. 42.5% of all households were made up of individuals, and 22.9% had someone living alone who was 65 years of age or older. The average household size was 2.08 and the average family size was 2.85.

The median age in the city was 45.6 years. 21.4% of residents were under the age of 18; 7.5% were between the ages of 18 and 24; 20.2% were from 25 to 44; 26.2% were from 45 to 64; and 24.6% were 65 years of age or older. The gender makeup of the city was 47.4% male and 52.6% female.

2000 census
As of the census of 2000, there were 3,137 people, 1,359 households, and 803 families living in the city. The population density was 2,030.6 people per square mile (786.5/km2). There were 1,526 housing units at an average density of 987.8 per square mile (382.6/km2). The racial makeup of the city was 89.35% White, 0.06% African American, 9.15% Native American, 0.06% Asian, 0.10% from other races, and 1.28% from two or more races. Hispanic or Latino of any race were 0.70% of the population.

There were 1,359 households, out of which 26.3% had children under the age of 18 living with them, 47.8% were married couples living together, 7.4% had a female householder with no husband present, and 40.9% were non-families. 36.9% of all households were made up of individuals, and 21.1% had someone living alone who was 65 years of age or older. The average household size was 2.24 and the average family size was 2.93.

In the city, the population was spread out, with 24.9% under the age of 18, 6.1% from 18 to 24, 24.4% from 25 to 44, 19.5% from 45 to 64, and 25.2% who were 65 years of age or older. The median age was 42 years. For every 100 females, there were 91.5 males. For every 100 females age 18 and over, there were 84.9 males.

As of 2000 the median income for a household in the city was $26,277, and the median income for a family was $38,472. Males had a median income of $26,858 versus $20,613 for females. The per capita income for the city was $15,717. About 10.7% of families and 16.0% of the population were below the poverty line, including 16.0% of those under age 18 and 18.8% of those age 65 or over.

Notable people
 Frank Leahy, the Notre Dame coach who took the Fighting Irish to several national championships
 Delores Taylor, the co-creator and star (as Jean) of the Billy Jack films, was born and raised in Winner and the Billy Jack films were due in part to the poor treatment Native Americans received by some of the residents of Winner.
 Nicolle Galyon, singer/songwriter

See also
 List of cities in South Dakota

References

External links

 
 

Cities in Tripp County, South Dakota
Cities in South Dakota
County seats in South Dakota